Zina Garrison-Jackson was the defending champion but lost in the semifinals to Brenda Schultz.

Meredith McGrath won in the final 7–6, 7–6 against Schultz.

Seeds
A champion seed is indicated in bold text while text in italics indicates the round in which that seed was eliminated.

  Zina Garrison-Jackson (quarterfinals)
  Amanda Coetzer (second round)
  Patty Fendick (quarterfinals)
  Lori McNeil (second round)
  Ann Grossman (second round)
  Brenda Schultz (final)
  Amy Frazier (semifinals)
  Linda Harvey-Wild (second round)

Draw

External links
 1994 IGA Classic Draw

1994 Singles
1994 WTA Tour